"Lady Godiva's Room" is a 1987 song by Simply Red. Written by Mick Hucknall, it was featured on the extended play The Montreux EP five years after its original release as the B-side of "Infidelity". It reached number 11 on the UK chart when released in November 1992.

This track was also included in the compilation album It's Only Love (2000).

References

1992 singles
Simply Red songs
Songs written by Mick Hucknall
1991 songs